2017 Independence Cup is the 9th edition of the football tournament Independence Cup. It was held in the annual anniversary of Albanian Flag Day. The participants were Albanian team Tirana, Macedonian club Struga (replacing Shkëndija), Montenegrin club Otrant and Kosovan club Liria (replacing Besa).

Struga won the tournament after penalty shoot-out.

Matches

Semi-finals

Final

References

2017–18 in Albanian football